Nsala soup is made with small pieces of yam with utazi leaves. The soup originates from the eastern part of Nigeria. A major ingredient is the catfish, which gives the soup a unique taste. Nsala is similar to Afia Efere, which is common among the Efik ethnic group.

Recipe
The soup is flavoured with ogiri or iru, utazi, crayfish, yam, salt, seasoning, stock fish and dry fish. The soup is served with yam, eba, semolina or any kind of morsel.

The major components of this soup are yam and catfish. However, you can use any other proteins of your choice for cooking, although catfish is an essential requirement.

See also
 List of soups

References

Nigerian cuisine